The Israel Cycling Federation or ICF (in Hebrew: איגוד האופניים בישראל) is the national governing body of cycle racing in Israel.

The ICF is a member of the UCI and the UEC.

References

External links
 Israel Cycling Federation official website
 Israel Cycling Federation details on the UCI site
 UEC: details of national federations (incl. ICF)

National members of the European Cycling Union
Cycle racing organizations
Cycling
Cycle racing in Israel